Minas Gekos (alternate spelling: Gkegos) (Greek: Μηνάς Γκέκος; born November 7, 1959 in Kurtuluş, Istanbul, Turkey) is a Greek professional basketball coach and a retired professional basketball player. At 6' 1" (1.87 m) in height, he played at the point guard and shooting guard positions.

Professional club playing career
Gekos started his playing career with İstanbul Teknik Üniversitesi in 1975. He later went to Greece, and joined AEK Athens, where he played until 1991. With AEK, he won the Greek Cup in 1981, and also played in the Greek Cup finals in 1978, 1980, and 1988.

Then he continued his career with Panathinaikos, from 1991 to 1994. As a member of the Panathinaikos roster, he won the Greek Cup in 1993, although he did not play in the final. Overall, he played in 4 Greek Cup Finals, and scored a total of 73 points in those games. He returned to AEK Athens, for the last season of his career as a player (1994–95).

In the top-tier level Greek League, he scored a total of 6,511 points, which is the 9th most total points scored in the competition, since the 1963–64 season. In the Greek A1 National League (which only counts Greek League games played since the 1986–87 season), he played in a total of 188 games, and scored 2,701 points.

National team playing career
Gekos played in 53 games with the senior men's Greek national basketball team. With Greece's senior national team, he played at the EuroBasket 1979 and the EuroBasket 1983. He also won gold medals at the 1979 Balkan Championship, and the 1979 Mediterranean Games.

Coaching career 
After he retired from playing professional basketball, Gekos started his coaching career in 1995, when he became an assistant coach under Vlado Đurović and Slobodan Subotić, in AEK Athens. In 1997, he became an assistant coach, under Subotić, with Panathinaikos. He became the head coach of Esperos Kallitheas, in 1999.

He then became the head coach of Apollon Patras, in 2000. He next became head coach of Papagou, in 2003. After that, he was Panagiotis Giannakis' assistant coach in Maroussi, and Luka Pavićević's assistant coach in Panionios.

He then worked as the head coach of Panionios, AEK Athens, and Kolossos.

Awards and accomplishments

Achievements as a player 
 2× Greek Cup Winner: (1981, 1993) 
 3× Greek Cup Runner-up: (1978, 1980, 1988) 
 9th all-time leading scorer of the Greek Basketball Championship, with 6,511 total points scored in the Greek A National League (1963–64 season to present).

Achievements as an assistant coach 
 2× Greek League Champion: (1998, 1999)

References

External links 
FIBA Europe Player Profile
Hellenic Basketball Federation Player Profile 
Τα “κανόνια” του ελληνικού Πρωταθλήματος: Μηνάς Γκέκος 
AEK.com Profile

1959 births
Living people
AEK B.C. players
AEK B.C. coaches
Apollon Patras B.C. coaches
Constantinopolitan Greeks
Esperos B.C. coaches
Greek basketball coaches
Greek men's basketball players
Greek Basket League players
İstanbul Teknik Üniversitesi B.K. players
Kolossos Rodou B.C. coaches
Panathinaikos B.C. players
Panionios B.C. coaches
Papagou B.C. coaches
Basketball players from Istanbul
Point guards
Shooting guards
Turkish people of Greek descent
Mediterranean Games gold medalists for Greece
Mediterranean Games medalists in basketball
Competitors at the 1979 Mediterranean Games
People from Şişli